Nansen-Apollo is a feature on Earth's Moon, a crater in Taurus-Littrow valley, at the base of the South Massif.  Astronauts Eugene Cernan and Harrison Schmitt visited it in 1972, on the Apollo 17 mission.  The astronauts referred to it simply as Nansen during the mission.  Geology Station 2 of the mission was located at Nansen.  Nansen is located in the 'light mantle' which is almost certainly an avalanche deposit from the South Massif.

To the north of Nansen is Lara crater and Geology Station 3.  To the northeast is Shorty and Geology Station 4.  About 5 km to the east are Mackin and Hess craters.

The crater was named by the astronauts after Fridtjof Nansen, a Norwegian explorer.

References

External links
43D1S2(25) Apollo 17 Traverses at Lunar and Planetary Institute
Geological Investigation of the Taurus-Littrow Valley: Apollo 17 Landing Site

Impact craters on the Moon
Apollo 17